Cherchell District is a district of Tipaza Province, Algeria.

See also

Districts of Tipaza Province